Paul Ioachim (1930 in Buzău, Romania – 2002) was a Romanian playwright, actor, and theater director. He was also the director of George Ciprian Theatre in Buzău.
Some of his works include:

 Ascensiunea unei fecioare
 Nu suntem îngeri
 Goana
 Nemaipomenitele aventuri a doi îndrăgostiți
 Așteptam pe altcineva
 Ce e nou pe Strada Salcâmilor
 Idealul
 Omul de noroi sau O viață și încă o noapte
 Podul sinucigașilor
 Totul e un joc
 Comedii... și ceva drame

See also
List of Romanian playwrights

References 

1930 births
2002 deaths